Bussy D'Ambois; Or, The Husbands Revenge is a 1691 tragedy by the English writer Thomas D'Urfey. It was first staged by the United Company at the Theatre Royal, Drury Lane in London. It is inspired by the earlier play of the same title by George Chapman, based on the real Louis de Bussy d'Amboise.

The original cast included John Freeman as Henry III of France, John Hodgson as Monsieur, Edward Kynaston as Duke of Guise, William Mountfort as D'Ambois, George Powell as Montfurry, George Bright as Monsieur Masse, William Bowen as Monsieur Lassoil, John Verbruggen as Bariser, Joseph Harris as Lanoo, Anne Bracegirdle as Tamira and Katherine Corey as Teresia. The published play was dedicated to the Earl of Carlisle, a Whig politician.

References

Bibliography
 Nicoll, Allardyce. History of English Drama, 1660-1900: Volume 1, Restoration Drama, 1660-1700. Cambridge University Press, 1952.
 Van Lennep, W. The London Stage, 1660-1800: Volume One, 1660-1700. Southern Illinois University Press, 1960.

1691 plays
West End plays
Tragedy plays
Plays by Thomas d'Urfey
Plays set in France
Plays set in the 16th century